Hoseynaki (also Romanized as Ḩoseynakī; also known as Husainaki) is a village in Howmeh Rural District, in the Central District of Bushehr County, Bushehr Province, Iran. At the 2006 census, its population was 504, in 116 families.

References 

Populated places in Bushehr County